Ballyrobert is a small village in County Antrim, Northern Ireland. It is about 4 km south of Ballyclare and has developed around the junction of the Ballyrobert Road and the Mossley Road/The Longshot. It had a population of 587 people in the 2001 Census. It was within the Newtownabbey Borough Council area which became the Antrim and Newtownabbey Borough Council in 2015.

2001 Census 
Ballyrobert is classified as a small village by the Northern Ireland Statistics and Research Agency (NISRA) (i.e. with population between 500 and 1,000 people). On Census day (29 April 2001) there were 587 people living in Ballyrobert. Of these:
23.6% were aged under 16 years and 14.6% were aged 60 and over
50.9% of the population were male and 49.1% were female
4.4% were from a Catholic background and 93.5% were from a Protestant background
1.7% of people aged 16–74 were unemployed

For more details see: NI Neighbourhood Information Service

Schools 
The local school in Ballyrobert is called The Thompson Primary. https://www.thethompsonprimary.com/ is for both males and females aged between 4 and 12 years.
This is taken from the school's website...
"Our ethos is firmly based on Christian principles and we aim to make each child feel valued and cared for. Our school motto is 'Every Child Matters' and we share in the nurture of every child in a stimulating yet secure environment."

References

See also
List of towns and villages in Northern Ireland

Villages in County Antrim